Defending champion Esther Vergeer and her partner Jiske Griffioen defeated the other defending champion Korie Homan and her partner Maaike Smit in the final, 6–4, 6–4 to win the women's doubles wheelchair tennis title at the 2006 US Open.

Draw

Finals

References 
 Draw

Women's Wheelchair Doubles
U.S. Open, 2006 Women's Doubles